Federal Route 67 is a federal road in Kedah, Malaysia, connecting Sungai Petani in the west to Baling in the east.

Route background
The Kilometre Zero of the Federal Route 67 is located at Sungai Petani, at its interchange with the Federal Route 1, the main trunk road of the central of Peninsular Malaysia.

Features

At most sections, the Federal Route 67 was built under the JKR R5 road standard, with a speed limit of 90 km/h.

List of junctions and towns

References

Malaysian Federal Roads